Man Alive is the fourth full-length album by the Israeli punk rock band of the same name. It was released February 26, 2008 on B& Recordings in the United States and Europe. The album was released via High Fiber Productions in Israel and Bullion Records in Japan.

After the band's breakthrough 2005 album, Open Surgery, a follow-up album was much anticipated within the Israeli punk scene, and more than a year passed since the album was recorded in August 2006.

An EP containing five songs from the recording sessions was released in February 2007 via Smith Seven Records, titled Access Denied!. The EP contained the song "Proud to Be Un-American", also featured on the album.

An album release concert was held at the Tmuna Theater, Tel Aviv, Israel on February 29, 2008.

Track listing

Personnel
Jamie Hilsden - lead vocals, rhythm guitar
David Shkedi - lead guitar, vocals 
Jon Shkedi - bass, vocals
Yair Braun - drums, percussion
 Recorded at the Panic Button Studios, Tempe, AZ, United States
 Produced, engineered and mixed by Jamie Woolford
 Mastered by Doug Van Sloun at Focus Mastering, Omaha, Neb.
 Additional engineering by Adam Krammer
 Mastered by Joe at Oceanview
 Design by Ben Nathan

References

2008 albums
Man Alive (band) albums